Archives of Yugoslavia, in Belgrade, Serbia, houses and protects the archival materials produced by state bodies and organizations of Yugoslavia from 1918 to 2006. It currently exists as a cultural institution, museum and library. The Archives' building is located in Senjak, which belongs to a designated cultural-historical area of Topčider, famous for its numerous public and private buildings assigned monument status. It is the most important archive and museum of the history of Yugoslavia.

History
The Archives of the Yugoslav state were founded in 1950, under the name State Archive of the Federal People's Republic of Yugoslavia (FNRJ). Three years later the name was changed to The State Archives of FNRJ, and in 1964, to The Archives of Yugoslavia. It retained this name until 2003, when, as a consequence of the creation of a State Union of Serbia and Montenegro, it was renamed The Archives of Serbia and Montenegro. In 2009, the Serbian government reinstated its previous name and granted it the status of high cultural importance.

Archives and collections
Within its 840 archives and collections, The Archives of Yugoslavia house 24.5 kilometers of records created between 1914 and 2006. The materials relate to the activities of the central government and state authorities in the areas of the domestic and foreign policy, finance, economy, healthcare, education, culture, social policy, justice, banking, and other topics.

Archival records from the period of the Kingdom of Yugoslavia comprise 146 archives of materials created between 1918 and 1945. The archival materials of the post-war Yugoslavia comprise 633 archives generated in the period between 1945 and 2006.

Building of the Archives

Erected in 1933 on the location of the First Non-commissioned Infantry Officer School "King Aleksandar I", the building was first called The Residential Home for Secondary School Students King Aleksandar I.

Vojin Petrovic designed the impressive three-story building in the Modernist style.
Its use changed with the beginning of the Second World War and the occupation, during which it housed the Headquarters of the Gestapo, as well as a section of the German military command for the South-West. After the war the building housed the Communist Party and a police school.

In 2003, a bust of King Aleksandar I, made from a sculpture created in 1936 by Slavko Miletic, was returned to the courtyard of the Archives building.

On 22 March 2007, the Serbian government declared the Archives building a Cultural Heritage Site of Serbia. On 19 February 2009, the cultural institution of the Archives of Yugoslavia was founded.

See also
 National Archives of Serbia
 Museum of Yugoslavia
 Yugoslav Film Archive
 Yugoslav Drama Theatre

References

Sources

 Архив Југославије, Београд, Архив Југославије, 2010

External links
 Official Website
 3D view
 Location of The Archives of Yugoslavia
 Lazić, Milorad. (20 March 2017). Yugoslavia is Gone, But Its Archives Remain. Woodrow Wilson International Center for Scholars.

Archives in Serbia
History of Yugoslavia
Buildings and structures in Belgrade
Yugoslavia
Scientific organizations based in Serbia
Savski Venac